Balas y Chocolate World Tour is the fifth concert tour of the Mexican singer Lila Downs, which is the eighth studio album is promoted : Balas y Chocolate.

Lila Downs Album Balas y Chocolate recently premiered, in the year 2015. This album is very personal and full of tradition, which is the winner of the Grammy UN I returned paragraph denounce the violence and corruption of Country do, like explores related to personal tragedies topics, feeding in the ways of the Day of the Dead. The First Bullet is simple and Chocolate "Patria Madrina" That motivates us to fight passionately one defender Our Land Our Nation and Our screens come when one through the UN Cuyo luxury short film shooting took place in Mexico. These ideas were reflected in their participation in the International Festival of Arts & Ideas in New Haven.

Within the tour, Lila Downs was recognized by the DePaul University in Chicago.

The tour ends in November 2016 with two presentations in Mexico City.

Tour dates

References 

2015 concert tours
2016 concert tours